Stephanocaryum is a genus of flowering plants belonging to the family Boraginaceae.

Its native range is Central Asia to Xinjiang.

Species:

Stephanocaryum dschagastanicum 
Stephanocaryum olgae 
Stephanocaryum popovii

References

Boraginoideae
Boraginaceae genera